Eslamabad (also Romanized as Eslāmābād) is a village in Eslamabad Rural District, in the Central District of Jiroft County, Kerman Province, Iran. At the 2006 census, its population was 257, in 53 families.

References 

Populated places in Jiroft County